Edward Walter "Ed" Jones (March 11, 1950 – December 14, 2012) was a North Carolina Democratic politician who represented the state's 4th Senate district (including Bertie, Chowan, Gates, Halifax, Hertford, Northampton, and Perquimans counties) in the North Carolina Senate.

Jones served in the U.S. Army's 82nd Airborne Division and graduated from Western Piedmont Community College with a degree in police science. He served for 30 years as a state trooper with the North Carolina Highway Patrol and after his retirement served as chief of police in Enfield, North Carolina.

Political career
Jones entered local politics when he was elected Mayor of Enfield. In 2005, he was appointed to the North Carolina House of Representatives to fill the vacancy caused by the death of state Rep. John D. Hall. He was elected by voters in the 7th district (Halifax and Nash counties) to a regular term in November 2006. But between his election to a full term and the opening of the legislative session in January 2007, state senator Robert L. Holloman died. Local Democratic Party leaders nominated Jones to fill Holloman's seat on January 18, 2007. Jones immediately resigned his House seat and was appointed by Governor Mike Easley to the Senate on January 23. Easley then appointed Angela R. Bryant to Jones's seat in the House. Jones was elected and re-elected to the Senate in 2008, 2010, and 2012. But one month after winning a new term in the 2012 election, Jones died at the age of 62, after suffering from pancreatic cancer. He died in Halifax County, North Carolina. A five-mile portion of US Highway 301 from the Edgecombe/Halifax County line through the Town of Enfield was renamed the "Senator Edward W. Jones Highway" in March 2018.

Family
Jones was married to Mary Ann Holden of Wendell, North Carolina; they had two daughters, Alesha Garrett and Andrea Long.

References

 Remarks on the House Floor by Rep. G.K. Butterfield Honoring North Carolina State Senator Edward Jones On The Occasion Of Recognition By Downtown Enfield Restoration And Preservation
 Official NC General Assembly page

|-

2012 deaths
Mayors of places in North Carolina
Democratic Party members of the North Carolina House of Representatives
Democratic Party North Carolina state senators
1950 births
African-American state legislators in North Carolina
21st-century American politicians
People from Enfield, North Carolina
21st-century African-American politicians
20th-century African-American people